Christian Nilsson may refer to:
 Christian Nilsson (golfer)
 Christian Nilsson (filmmaker)